Severny Kommunar is a rural locality (a settlement) and the administrative center of Severokommunarskoye Rural Settlement, Sivinsky District, Perm Krai, Russia. The population was 1,625 as of 2010. There are 41 streets.

Geography 
Severny Kommunar is located on the Malaya Siva River, 24 km west of Siva (the district's administrative centre) by road. Yefimovo is the nearest rural locality.

References 

Rural localities in Perm Krai
Populated places in Sivinsky District